London with the Lights On is the debut studio album by English girl group Stooshe. It was originally set for release on 25 June 2012 under the name of Swings and Roundabouts, but was held back twice; under the new self-titled name and was name changed and released on 27 May 2013.

"Love Me" was released on 4 March 2012 as the album's lead single, peaking at number 5 on the UK Singles Chart. "Black Heart" was released as the second single on 15 June 2012 and became the group's highest-charting single to date, peaking at number 3. The third single from the album was initially intended to be "Waterfalls", a cover of the TLC song, which was released on 11 November 2012; however, Stooshe later revealed that it would not make the cut for the final track list and that they were disowning it. "Slip" was released as the album's third single on 12 May 2013, peaking at number 12.

Background
Stooshe's début album was announced around the time of the release of the first single, "Love Me". It was initially titled Swings and Roundabouts and a release date was set for 25 June 2012. However, Stooshe later announced the album would be self-titled and would be released on 26 November 2012. On 15 November, Robert Copsey from Digital Spy reported that the album's release would be delayed until March 2013. A statement from the group explained "Following a late rush of creativity which has seen them write some of the best songs of their career, Stooshe have decided to delay the release of their début album until March 2013 so they have time to record these songs for inclusion on the album." Stooshe added that they would be going back to the studio soon to record the new songs.

Copsey later confirmed that the album would be released on 27 May 2013. The band revealed that they delayed the release of the album to undo their record label's interference. Anderson stated "It was down to us that our album didn't come out months ago," said Anderson. "It was ready to go, but we was listening to it and realised the label had changed a few mixes, a few structures and even taken off a few songs. We made this album before we got signed so it was important for us to still have control." The band also added that their third single, "Waterfalls", would not appear on the album and that they were disowning it. On 5 April, Sam Hine from Popjustice reported that Stooshe had renamed their album London with the Lights On.

Reception

Caroline Sullivan from The Guardian gave London with the Lights On four out of five stars and commented "Listening to the album is akin to eavesdropping on a conversation between funny, trash-talking women who happen to sing like a trio of Beyoncés: it's a noisy, highly entertaining 50 minutes." Stephen Unwin, writing for the Daily Express, said "It feels like we've been waiting a long time for this first album and in no way does it disappoint. A little En Vogue here, a lot of Salt-n-Pepa there, it is a witty, confident, exceptional debut." The Independent's Simon Price also received the album well, saying "The south London trio's effortlessly assured debut combines classic 1960s soul, streetparty reggae, upfront electro-pop, cackling Night Bus backchat and shameless sexual innuendo. And there is nothing not to love about it." However, Price's colleague Andy Gill gave the album one star, explaining that London with the Lights On "is pretty thin fare" and that the majority of songs collapse "under the weight of excess sass."

Singles
"Love Me", featuring US rapper Travie McCoy, was released as the lead single from the album on 4 March 2012, peaking at number 5 on the UK Singles Chart. The accompanying music video was released on 16 January 2012.
"Black Heart", the album's second single, was released on 17 June 2012. The song peaked at number 3, becoming Stooshe's highest-charting single to date.
 "Slip" was released as the third single on 12 May 2013. The song peaked at number 12 in the UK.
 "My Man Music" was released as the fourth single on 28 July 2013. The music video was filmed in the week beginning 10 June and released on 20 June.

Track listing
Track listing confirmed by iTunes.

Charts

Release history

References

2013 debut albums
Warner Music Group albums
Contemporary R&B albums by English artists